, also known as the  for sponsorship reasons, is an athletic and football stadium in the town of Rifu in Miyagi Prefecture, Japan. The stadium's capacity is 49,133. The crescent-shaped roof extending past the edge of the stadium is meant to evoke images of Date Masamune, a daimyō of Mutsu Province, which included the present-day Miyagi Prefecture. The stadium adopted its current name on 1 April 2020 due to a sponsorship agreement with the Q&A Corporation.

Miyagi Stadium hosted three matches in the 2002 World Cup, and also hosted the 56th National Sports Festival of Japan in 2001. It is one of the planned football venues for the 2020 Summer Olympics.

In addition, Miyagi Stadium also hosted six matches at the 2012 FIFA U-20 Women's World Cup and it would become the first stadium (and to date the only stadium) to have hosted matches at both a men's FIFA World Cup and a women's FIFA U-20 World Cup.

Vegalta, Mynavi and Sony Sendai only use where occasionally.

The football field is surrounded by a nine-lane track. A large video screen and scoreboard is installed in the northern end.

2002 FIFA World Cup matches

2012 FIFA U-20 Women's World Cup matches

Football at the 2020 Summer Olympics

Women's

Men's

Other notable events 
Besides the game against Turkey, Miyagi Stadium has hosted three friendly matches involving the Japan national team: A 1–1 draw against Slovakia on 11 June 2000, a 5–4 victory against Honduras on 7 September 2005, and a 2–4 loss against Uruguay on 14 August 2013, a 2–0 victory against El Salvador on 9 June 2019. J. League club Vegalta Sendai has held home games at Miyagi Stadium, and pop-music group SMAP has held two outdoor concerts at the venue as well.

Access
Rifu Station is the closest train station, although it is nearly 3.5 kilometers from the stadium. For major events, bus transportation is usually available from Izumi-Chūō and Sendai Stations. Before the World Cup, a spur from the Sanriku Expressway was built, which provided easier access for travellers by car from Tokyo and other locales.

See also
 Yurtec Stadium Sendai
 Sekisui Heim Super Arena
 List of stadiums in Japan
 2002 FIFA World Cup shock defeat (Japan, Argentina)
 Luis Suárez ＆ Diego Forlán (Match against Japan in 2013)

References

External links 
Stadium information 

2002 FIFA World Cup stadiums in Japan
Venues of the 2020 Summer Olympics
Football venues in Japan
Sports venues in Miyagi Prefecture
Athletics (track and field) venues in Japan
Sports venues completed in 2000
Rifu, Miyagi
Olympic football venues
2000 establishments in Japan